The Epstein Theatre, built in 1913, is one of many theatres in Liverpool, England. It has been threatened with closure several times, but reopened in May 2011 after a £1.2m refurbishment. It has now been renamed the Epstein Theatre, in honour of Brian Epstein, the manager of The Beatles. The theatre seats 380 on its two levels.

History
The theatre originally opened in 1913 as Crane's Music Hall. The Crane Brothers' music store had been trading for several years when they opened the music hall above their store on Hanover Street in central Liverpool. Over the first few years, many amateur drama groups staged productions there, thus leading to its renaming as the Crane Theatre in 1938.

Little changed over the next twenty years, until in 1960 a bar was opened in the theatre's box office area. However, the theatre was threatened with closure in 1966. In 1967 the theatre was purchased from the Cranes by Liverpool Corporation, who decided that the theatre should be run by local people for local people. To reflect the city's maritime history the name of the theatre was changed again, this time to the Neptune Theatre, after Neptune, the Roman god of the seas and central character in Marc Lescarbot's "Theatre of Neptune in New France" (Canada's first European play, written and performed in 1606).

However, the future of the Neptune was not as secure as first seemed. A fall in the number of amateur drama groups led to a drop in shows. The corporation, by now named Liverpool City Council, suggested closure again in 1993. This caused a huge outcry around the city and many performers, including Dame Judi Dench, were part of the campaign to keep the theatre open. In order to attract audiences, a professional pantomime Snow White was staged in the theatre. This proved to be a huge success, with a professional panto then being held every year in the theatre.

Although he had nothing to do with the Neptune, the theatre was dedicated to the memory of Beatles manager Brian Epstein by the city council in 1997, for his contributions to the city's cultural and musical scene. Local artist Tony Brown offered a portrait of Epstein on permanent loan to the theatre in 1999 and this now hangs in the bar.

The theatre was chosen for a special BBC filming of Steve Coogan's Paul & Pauline Calf's Cheese and Ham Sandwich programme.
It was the home of long-established Crosby Gilbert And Sullivan Society until 2016.
Its striking interior has often been used as a location for film and TV productions.

Refurbishment

In 2005 the theatre closed for refurbishment, with an estimated reopening date of September 2007. In 2007 Liverpool City Council, who lease the Theatre from Mr. David Ramsey owner of the building, commissioned an independent valuation of the Theatre's rental value, after months of negotiations with no progression on the terms of the new lease. The refurbished theatre eventually reopened in May 2012. 
Since its refurbishment it has hosted pantomimes such as Snow White and the Seven Dwarfs  starring Amanda Harrington from Desperate Scousewives and other charity events.

References

External links
 Liverpool Theatre History
  Other Liverpool Theatres
 Official Epstein Theatre website

Grade II listed buildings in Liverpool
Neptune, the